Henry Thia (born 25 February 1952), also known as , is a Singaporean actor and comedian.

Career
Thia was a member of the main cast of Comedy Nite throughout its run, having the opportunity to work with both Jack Neo and Mark Lee. The trio also acted in movies together such as Money No Enough, That One No Enough, Money No Enough 2 and Where Got Ghost? He also made a transition to English television between 2004 and 2010 from Seasons 1 to 6, where he played the recurring role of Georgie Gan in Police & Thief alongside with Mark Lee once again, where his character is the main rival of Lee's protagonist character named Lee Tok Kong.

Thia is also known to the public for his strikingly similar looks to Singaporean politician Khaw Boon Wan, a fact he often acknowledges by jokingly referring to Khaw as his twin.

Filmography

Film
1998
Money No Enough
1999
Liang Po Po: The Movie
That One No Enough
2002
I Not Stupid
2005
I Do, I Do
One More Chance
2006
I Not Stupid Too
The Vietnamese Bride
2007
Just Follow Law
2008
Money No Enough 2
Folks Jump Over the Wall
2009
Love Matters
Where Got Ghost?
2010
Old Cow vs Tender Grass
Phua Chu Kang The Movie
Lelio Popo
2011
The Ghosts Must Be Crazy
It's a Great, Great World
Fist of Dragon
2012
Greedy Ghost
2013
Judgement Day
Firefly
Red Numbers
2014
A Fantastic Ghost Wedding
Kiasu
2015
My Papa Rich
2016
Long Long Time Ago
Young & Fabulous
Let's Eat
2017
Take 2
2018
Wonderful! Liang Xi Mei
2019
Red Storm
2020
Number 1The Diam Diam Era2021The Diam Diam Era TwoLate Night Ride 开夜车2022Reunion DinnerTelevision series
1998Hitman in the City (TV movie)
2002Beautiful Connection 九层糕
2005Zero to Hero 阴差阳错
2007Folks Jump Over The Wall 飞越佛跳墙World of Laughs 搞笑至尊
2008Pulau Hantu (TV movie)
2009Sayang Sayang2010Happy Family 过好年
2012Beyond X元素
2016Hero 大英雄I Want to Be a Star 小咖大作战
2017Life Less Ordinary 小人物向前冲Have A Little Faith 相信我Happy Can Already! 2 欢喜就好2Happy Can Already! 3 欢喜就好3
2018My Agent is a Hero 流氓经纪Happy Can Already! 4 欢喜就好4
2022I Want to be a Tow Kay'' 亲家冤家做头家

Accolades

References

External links

Profile on xinmsn

Living people
Singaporean male film actors
Singaporean male television actors
Singaporean people of Hokkien descent
1952 births
20th-century Singaporean male actors
21st-century Singaporean male actors
Singaporean comedians